Gentleman is a 1989 Indian Hindi-language action drama film directed by Vinod R. Verma, starring Govinda and Anuradha Patel.

Plot
Identical twins brothers Hari and Om were separated at birth. They both are shocked to meet each other when they have grown up. Shakti is a robber, who made Hari send him in jail because of his crime, when Om was taking care of his family as Hari. Will Om be able to release his twin brother Hari from jail?

Cast 
Govinda as Hariprasad a.k.a. Hari/Om
Anuradha Patel as Devi
Shakti Kapoor as Shakti
Nagina Khan as Nagina
Javed Khan as Master Javed
Om Shivpuri as Hari and Om's Father
Yunus Parvez as Kadar Bhai
Ashalata Wabgaonkar as Durga
Shiva Rindani as Shiva
Prem Bedi as Ghulshan Dada
Yashwant Dutt as Ramsay
Shamla as Rita

Music
"Raste Main Hum Mile, Raste Main Dil Mile, Main Hoon Gentleman" - Bappi Lahiri, Sharon Prabhakar
"Taar Hilne Lage, Kahmbe Gadne Lage, Bijali Vala Na Aye" - Shubha Joshi, Udit Narayan
"Ba Bablu Ba Bablu, You Are My Girl Friend, Ma Malu" - Bappi Lahiri, Sapna Mukherjee
"Chhori Pat Gayi Re, Chakar Chalake Humko Liya Fasaye" - Vijay Benedict, Shubha Joshi

References

External links
 

1989 films
1980s Hindi-language films
Indian action films
Films scored by Bappi Lahiri
1989 action films
Hindi-language action films